Devol is a town in Cotton County, Oklahoma, United States. The population was 151 at the 2010 census, an increase of 0.7 percent from 150 at the 2000 census. The town is named for J. Fiske Devol, who owned the land on which it stands.

History
The community of Devol began in 1907, when the Wichita Falls and Northwestern Railway laid tracks through the area. A post office was established there on November 30, 1907. The railroad became a subsidiary of the Missouri, Kansas and Texas Railroad (MK&T or Katy) in 1911. By that year, the town had about 400 residents.

Discovery of the nearby Burkburnett Oil Field in 1918 initiated a brief boom in Devol. At least two refineries were built in the area, along with several oil pipelines. The 1920 census showed the population was 1,936. The town had the first dynamo in the area used for power in one of the two dance halls. Devol is said to have had four churches, a lumber store, feed store, a hotel, two dance halls/bars, a brothel and hundreds of small structures to rent as a home during the growing Burk boom.  However, the boom ended in 1922, and most of the people related to that business moved away. The town bank failed in 1927. In 1930, the population of Devol was only 328. The 1940 census showed 208 residents.

Legend has it that just before World War II, the oil refineries office was visited by the local Ku Klux Klan (KKK) in full dress whites. The KKK demanded the program manager fire all Catholics at the plant in support of the pending war. The manager was said to reply "That is a good idea! ... one I had not thought of ... give me the weekend to think it over and I will let you know on Monday." On Monday morning, the group returned to find the refinery was closed and the gate had a pad lock on it. The manager had moved himself and his family out of town on the Saturday train. After this closure the population was said to have dropped by 100 within a month.

Devol continued to shrink after World War II. Only 152 residents remained in 1950. The high school closed in 1953, and in 1957, all grades were consolidated along with those of Randlett and Union Valley to form the Big Pasture School District in Randlett. In 1959 a tornado damaged most of Devol's business district (all three on the main street) and the old high school building. The town's population reached 117, the lowest recorded in its history. The MK&T abandoned its tracks in 1972, and in the 1980s the only remaining business was a tack shop that specialized in making race horse saddles. It closed in the 1990s.

Although there has been a slight rebound in population, no businesses are now in Devol and the post office had been threatened with closure in 1997 and 2002, but has weathered the storm for 10 years so far as of this posting.

Devol never had a police force except the KKK. They were the enforcers of Friday night assaults, robberies, and church attendances. Also the "Klan band" would play in the town center gazebo in the summer time. The local two-cell jail stands to this day.

Geography
Devol is located at  (34.193755, -98.590533).

Demographics

As of the census of 2000, there were 150 people, 62 households, and 40 families residing in the town. There were 68 housing units at an average density of 136.9 per square mile (52.5/km2). The racial makeup of the town was 90.67% White, 4.67% Native American, and 4.67% from two or more races. Hispanic or Latino of any race were 8.67% of the population.

There were 62 households, out of which 30.6% had children under the age of 18 living with them, 56.5% were married couples living together, 8.1% had a female householder with no husband present, and 33.9% were non-families. 33.9% of all households were made up of individuals, and 16.1% had someone living alone who was 65 years of age or older. The average household size was 2.42 and the average family size was 3.12.

In the town, the population was spread out, with 22.7% under the age of 18, 10.7% from 18 to 24, 29.3% from 25 to 44, 21.3% from 45 to 64, and 16.0% who were 65 years of age or older. The median age was 36 years. For every 100 females, there were 114.3 males. For every 100 females age 18 and over, there were 107.1 males.

The median income for a household in the town was $35,313, and the median income for a family was $46,563. Males had a median income of $23,750 versus $28,333 for females. The per capita income for the town was $14,792. There were 2.1% of families and 9.4% of the population living below the poverty line, including 2.0% of under eighteens and 36.0% of those over 64.

References

External links
 Encyclopedia of Oklahoma History and Culture - Devol

Towns in Cotton County, Oklahoma
Towns in Oklahoma
Populated places established in 1907